Roszowicki Las  (German: Roschowitzwald) is a village in the administrative district of Gmina Cisek, within Kędzierzyn-Koźle County, Opole Voivodeship, in south-western Poland.

The village has a population of 590.

Gallery

References

Roszowicki Las